Bernard Laporte (born 1 July 1964) is a rugby player, coach and former French Secretary of State for Sport. From 1999 to 2007, Laporte was the head coach of the France national team.  In 2011, he became the head coach at Toulon, after Philippe Saint-André became the new national team coach. He was previously the coach at Stade Français. He was the first fully professional head coach of France. Laporte was president of the French Rugby Federation from December 2016 to January 2023.

Playing career
Laporte played rugby union at scrum-half and won the French Under-21 championship with UA Gaillac in 1983 and then again in 1984, in which he was captain. Seven years later he captained Begles-Bordeaux to the French championship.

Early coaching roles
Laporte's first coaching role was in the early 1990s, when he was assistant coach of the Stade Bordelais University club between 1993 and 1995. He took over at Stade Français in 1995, who were in the third division at the time. He took them right up to the first division in three seasons, winning the respective championships. The club were crowned champions of France in 1998, when they defeated USA Perpignan 34–7 at Stade de France.

Head coach of France
Laporte took over as head coach of the national team at the end of 1999. His first task was the 2000 Six Nations Championship, the first of its format, since the addition of Italy. Laporte drew on the experience of the 1999 Rugby World Cup, where France had been losing finalists (to Australia). Laporte named Fabien Pelous as captain. In France's first game under Laporte, they defeated Wales 36–3. France ended up winning three of their five matches which saw them finish second, behind winner England.

Laporte became renowned for his commitment to improving discipline; he even suspended captain Fabien Pelous once for foul play. Laporte said that discipline was not only important for team morale, but also for promoting the game of rugby:
I am trying to make them understand that these acts are inadmissible... If a player goes into the sinbin, his teammates have to fill in for him. I wanted [Pelous] to realise that by being yellow-carded he simply punishes his own team. ... We are talking about the future of our sport and if we want rugby to become more successful and more media friendly, we have to take a hard line on violence.

The following season, France fell to fifth place in the 2001 Six Nations Championship, winning only two of their five matches; against Scotland and Italy. However, the following year, Laporte took France to victory in the 2002 Six Nations Championship – not only winning the tournament, but completing a grand slam.

After the massive success at the 2002 Six Nations, France fell to third place in the subsequent tournament, though they still won three of their five matches. France finished top of their pool at the 2003 Rugby World Cup in Australia winning all four of their pool matches. France then defeated Ireland 43–21 in the quarter-finals to move into the semi-finals. They were defeated 24–7 by England in the semi-final and moved on to the third/fourth place play-off, which they lost to the All Blacks, and thus finished fourth at the World Cup.

After the strong showing at the World Cup, France reproduced their Six Nations success of 2002 at the 2004 Six Nations Championship. France won all five of their matches to win the tournament and complete another grand slam. France finished second, behind Wales in the 2005 Six Nations Championship, and the following year at the 2006 tournament, France won again, getting their third Six Nations trophy under Laporte.

After eight years in charge of the French national team, he resigned as coach following the 2007 Rugby World Cup. In his final Six Nations Championship in charge of France, his team won four out of their five games and emerged champions after edging out Ireland on points difference.

International matches as Head coach 
Note: World Rankings Column shows the World Ranking France was placed at on the following Monday after each of their matches

Record by country

Honors 
 French Rugby Union Championship/Top 14
 Winner: 1997–98
 Rugby World Cup
 Fourth place : 2003, 2007
 Six Nations Championship
 Winner : 2002, 2004, 2006, 2007
 Grand Slam : 2002, 2004
 Runner-up : 2000, 2005
 Third place : 2003
 Giuseppe Garibaldi Trophy
 Winner : 2007
 Trophée des Bicentenaires
 Winner : November 2001, November 2004, November 2005
 IRB International Coach of the Year
 Winner: 2002

Secretary of Sport
It was announced on 19 June 2007, that after the Rugby World Cup in October, Laporte would be named Secretary of State for Youth and Sports in the government of François Fillon. He was appointed on 22 October 2007 as Secretary of State for Sports only.

He was involved in the disputes between the Amaury Sport Organisation, organizers of the Tour de France, the French Cycling Federation and the Union Cycliste Internationale.

Laporte left this cabinet office on 23 June 2009, and was succeeded by Rama Yade.

Further club coaching
Laporte returned to rugby coaching at Bayonne in 2010, but lasted only two months. Laporte was then involved with Stade Français until being signed by Toulon.

Toulon achieved enormous success under his coaching, including winning the Heineken Cup/European Rugby Champions Cup in 2012–13, 2013–14 and 2014–15.

Rugby administration
Laporte was  elected president of the French Rugby Federation in late 2016. In May 2017, he joined the World Rugby executive committee, taking the seat left vacant by his predecessor Pierre Camou. He was elected during the general assembly of World Rugby in Kyoto, at the expense of the president of the South African Federation, Mark Alexander. 

In July 2019, Laporte was elected vice-president of the Six Nations tournament committee. In 2020 he ran unopposed for vice-chairman of World Rugby, replacing Agustín Pichot and taking office from 12 May 2020 alongside the re-elected chairman Bill Beaumont.

In December 2022 a French court found Laporte guilty of corruption, fining him €75,000 and sentencing him to two years' imprisonment (suspended). He has stated that he will "self-suspend" from rugby administration, but that he will appeal.

Trivia
He participates in a programme of RMC-Info each Monday, Direct Laporte.
His puppet is a recurrent character in the satirical TV shox Les Guignols de l'Info, who incenses violence in rugby, described as the "valeurs de l'ovalie" (values of rugby) in a hyperbolic manner.

Laporte has named Bakkies Botha as the greatest player he coached.

References

External links
Star Q&A – Bernard Laporte
Bernard Laporte
Website of his programme in RMC

1964 births
Living people
People from Rodez
French rugby union coaches
RC Toulonnais coaches
Stade Français coaches
French rugby union players
Rugby union scrum-halves
World Rugby Awards winners
France national rugby union team coaches
Sportspeople from Aveyron
Presidents of the French Rugby Federation
CA Bordeaux-Bègles Gironde players